Ceanu Mare is a commune in the north-west of Romania, in Cluj County, Transylvania. It is composed of thirteen villages: Andici (depopulated since 1985; Andics), Boian (Mezőbő), Bolduț (Boldoc), Ceanu Mare, Ciurgău (Csurgó), Dosu Napului (Oláhtóhát), Fânațe (Csániszénafű), Hodăi-Boian (Mezőbőifogadó), Iacobeni (Mezőszentjakab), Morțești (Morcest), Stârcu (Csóka), Strucut (merged with Gherea in 1968; Sztinkutdűlő) and Valea lui Cati (Sárospatakdűlő). 

The village is known in Germany after the Schröder family discovered that the father of former Chancellor Gerhard Schröder was buried there in a common grave in 1944. Lieutenant Fritz Schröder was a soldier in the German army during World War II and he died at the age of 32 near the city of Turda (Thorenburg in German) on 4 October 1944, without ever seeing his newborn son Gerhard.

Demographics 
According to the census from 2002 there was a total population of 4,322 people living in this town. Of this population, 94.08% are ethnic Romanians, 3.51% ethnic Romani and 2.36% are ethnic Hungarians.

References 

Communes in Cluj County
Localities in Transylvania